The Social Significance of the Modern Drama is a 1914 treatise by Emma Goldman on political implications of significant playwrights in the late nineteenth and early twentieth centuries.

Goldman, who had done significant work with Modernist dramatists (managing tours, hosting, publicizing, and lecturing), here published her analyses of the political implications of modern drama. The book featured analyses of the political—even radical—implications of the work of playwrights including Henrik Ibsen, August Strindberg, Hermann Sudermann, Gerhart Hauptmann, Frank Wedekind, Maurice Maeterlinck, Edmond Rostand, Brieux, George Bernard Shaw, John Galsworthy, Stanley Houghton, Githa Sowerby, William Butler Yeats, Lennox Robinson, T. G.(C) Murray, Leo Tolstoy, Anton Tchekhof (more familiar in English as "Anton Chekhov"), Maxim Gorky, and Leonid Andreyev. Goldman published the book as she set out on a tour, hoping to acquaint radicals and ordinary citizens alike to the radical potential of modern drama.

The book was first published in 1914, Richard G. Badger, The Gorham Press, in Boston, and in Toronto, the Copp Clark Co., Ltd. The book was not a commercial success, and was quickly out of print.

See also
 Anarchism and the arts
 Expressionism (theatre)

References
 Arthur Redding, "The Dream Life of Political Violence: Georges Sorel, Emma Goldman, and the Modern Imagination", Modernism/Modernity, v.2, n.2, pp. 1–16 (April 1995) (analyzing Social Significance as part of an examination of ties between Modernism and anarchism)
 Alice T. Friedman, "A House Is Not a Home: Hollyhock House as 'Art-Theater Garden', The Journal of the Society of Architectural Historians, v.51, n.3 (Sept. 1992), pp. 239–260 (speculating that likely influence of Goldman's work on Aline Barnsdall's commission of Hollyhock House, a Frank Lloyd Wright mansion intended to establish a progressive theatrical community in the Los Angeles neighborhood, Olive Hill)

Footnotes

External links

Online Sources

 Available online at the Anarchy Archives
 Google Books (full-text, PDF, links to commentary in other books)
 RevoltLib Text Source

Commentary

 Political Literary Criticism, Excerpts, 1883-2003 - Brief excerpts from Goldman and commentary on Goldman's work by other critics

1914 non-fiction books
Political art
Non-fiction books about theatre
Books by Emma Goldman
Books of literary criticism
Modernist theatre